was a district located in Yamaguchi Prefecture, Japan.

On March 20, 2008, the day before its dissolution, the district consisted solely of the towns of Mitō (美東町) and Shūhō (秋芳町).

History
 April 1, 1889 - Due to the municipal status enforcement, the villages of Akagō, Akiyoshi, Ayagi, Beppu, Higashiatsu, Isa, Iwanaga, Kyōwa, Managata, Nishiatsu, Ōda, Ofuku and, Ōmine, were formed. (13 villages)
 August 1, 1923 - The village of Ōda town status to become the town of Ōda. (1 town, 12 villages)
 January 1, 1924 - The village of Isa was elevated to town status to become the town of Isa. (2 towns, 11 villages)
 May 1, 1939 - The village of Ōmine was elevated to town status to become the town of Ōmine. (3 towns, 10 villages)
 March 31, 1954 - The towns of Ōmine, Isa, and the villages of Higashiatsu, Nishiatsu and Ofuku were merged with the town of Toyotamae (from Toyoura District) to create the city of Mine while leaving Mine District. (1 town, 7 villages)
 October 1, 1954 - The towns of Ōda, Akagō, Ayagi, and Managata were merged to create the town of Mitō. (1 town, 4 villages)
 April 1, 1955 - The villages of Akiyoshi, Iwanaga, Beppu and Kyōwa were merged to create the town of Shūhō. (2 towns)
 March 21, 2008 - The towns of Mitō and Shūhō were merged into the expanded city of Mine. Mine District dissolved as a result of this merger.

See also
List of dissolved districts of Japan

Former districts of Yamaguchi Prefecture